Pumpuang Duangjan, also known by the nickname Pueng ("Bee") (4 August 1961 – 13 June 1992), was a Thai megastar. She was the symbol of Thai songs culture. She was the singer, actress who pioneered electronic Luk Thung. She is considered one of the most important Luk Thung vocalists in Thailand. The child of poor farmers, Pumpuang had only two years of primary education before her family's plight forced her to take to the fields as a sugar cane cutter. Although illiterate, she was adept at memorising lyrics and participated in many local singing competitions. At age 15, she came to the notice of a visiting band by Waiphot Phetsuphan, and from the late 1970s onwards her fame skyrocketed.

Legacy
Today she is remembered for her lyrics, which told of Thailand's rural poor. She adapted pleng luk thung (Thai country music) into a dance-ready form known as electronic luk thung. Although loved by millions of fans, her music career was marred by Pumpuang's lovers, managers, and promoters, who deprived her of her earnings, to the extent that she could not afford treatment for a blood disorder that eventually caused her death at the age of 30.

In 2018, she was featured as a Google Doodle on what would have been her 57th birthday.

Discography

Albums
 1982 – Jah Hai Ror Hai Por.Sor. Nai (จะให้รอ พ.ศ. ไหน)
 1982 – Duang Tah Duang Jai (ดวงตา~ดวงใจ)
 1983 – Seen in District/Nad Pob Nah Amphoe (นัดพบหน้าอำเภอ)
 1983 – Sao Nah Sang Faen (สาวนาสั่งแฟน)
 1984 – Ting Nah Leum Toong (ทิ้งนาลืมทุ่ง)
 1985 – Hue Hue!...Lor Jang (อื้อฮื้อ!...หล่อจัง)
 1985 – Kon Dang Leum Lang Kway (คนดังลืมหลังควาย)
 1986 – Harng Noy Thoy Nid (ห่างหน่อย-ถอยนิด)
 1986 – Chua Tee Dee Jed Hon (ชั่วเจ็ดที-ดีเจ็ดหน)

Music Line/Topline Music 
 1986 – Grasshopper Tie a Bow/Takkatan Pook Boh (ตั๊กแตนผูกโบ)
 1986 – Phumpuang's Clever/Tee Ded Pumpuang (ทีเด็ดพุ่มพวง)
 1987 – Klom (กล่อม)
 1987 – Dangerous/Antarai (อันตราย)
 1988 – Pumpuang'31 (พุ่มพวง '31)
 1988 – Pumpuang'31 Part 2 (พุ่มพวง '31 ภาค 2)
 1989 – Pumpuang'32 (พุ่มพวง '32)
 1989 – Pumpuang'32 Part 2 (พุ่มพวง '32 ภาค 2)
 1990 – Good Luck the Money/Kho Hai Ruay (ขอให้รวย)
 1991 – Num Phueang Duean Ha (น้ำผึ้งเดือนห้า)
 1992 – Ruk Thae Phae Ruk Tiem (รักแท้แพ้รักเทียม)

Filmography

Movies
 1984 – Nun (ชี)
 1984 – Ms. Fresh Coconut Milk (นางสาวกะทิสด)
 1984 – We're Sorry Love (ขอโทษที ที่รัก)
 1984 – King Cobra Emerged (จงอางผงาด)
 1985 – Love Hoow She Is (ที่รัก เธออยู่ไหน)
 1986 – New Gunman (มือปืนคนใหม่)
 1987 – Charming Singer (เสน่ห์นักร้อง)
 1987 – Captive Love (เชลยรัก)
 1987 – Music Love Song Gun (เพลงรัก เพลงปืน)
 1988 – Diamond Kingdom (เพชรพยัคฆราช)

Biographical film
2011 – The Moon (พุ่มพวง) directed by Bhandit Thongdee

References

External links
 The Moon (Pumpuang Duangjan)

1961 births
1992 deaths
Pumpuang Duangjan
Pumpuang Duangjan
Pumpuang Duangjan
Deaths from lupus
Pumpuang Duangjan
Pumpuang Duangjan
Pumpuang Duangjan